The Capricorn Plate is a proposed minor tectonic plate lying beneath the Indian Ocean basin in the southern and eastern hemispheres. The original theory of plate tectonics as accepted by the scientific community in the 1960s assumed fully rigid plates and relatively narrow, distinct plate boundaries. However, research in the late 20th and early 21st centuries suggests that certain plate junctions are diffuse across several dozen or even hundred kilometres. The Capricorn Plate is a relatively rigid piece of oceanic crust along the far western edge of the former Indo-Australian Plate.

References

Tectonic plates
Geology of the Indian Ocean